Elena Busso (born 4 January 1976) is an Italian volleyball player.

Sporting achievements

Clubs 
Italian Cup:
  2002
Challenge Cup:
  2002

References

External links

 LegaVolleyFemminile profile
 Women.Volleybox profile

1976 births
Living people
People from Savigliano
Italian women's volleyball players
Sportspeople from the Province of Cuneo